Bruckneudorf is a small town in the district of Neusiedl am See in the federal state of Burgenland in Austria, neighbouring Bruck an der Leitha ("Leitha Bridge"). Its name means bridge new village, whereas the Hungarian version means royal bridge, and the royal refers to  King Francis I. Historically and geographically, Bruckneudorf represents the extension of the Austrian town of Bruck an der Leitha over the Austrian border into Hungary. This border, symbolised by the river Leitha, separated the Austrian Empire from the Kingdom of Hungary (Cisleithania and Transleithania). Its main current national significance derives from the Bruckneudorf military exercise ground of the Austrian federal army. Currently it is also the site of Bruck an der Leitha railway station, an important railway station near the borders with Hungary and Slovakia, a stop for nearly all the international trains that pass through it.

History 
Together with the rest of Burgenland, the municipality was in Hungary (under the name of German West Hungary) until 1920/21. From 1898, although a largely German speaking area, it was required to take the Hungarian name of Királyhida as part of the Hungarian language policy of the national government in Budapest. After World War I, under the treaties of St. Germain and Trianon, German West Hungary was transferred to Austria (see History of Burgenland). In Roman times the area was already densely populated, and Villa Bruckneudorf, one of the most important Roman villas to be discovered in Eastern Austria, is a few kilometres to the east.

The Imperial Park (Kaiserpark) has the only memorial of the Emperor Francis Joseph I in modern Austrian territory which describes him by his other title of King of Hungary.

A chapter in The Good Soldier Švejk, which deals with the relationship between the Hungarian community and other nationalities in Austria-Hungary, is set in this town.

Climate

Population

Economy and infrastructure 
The Bruckneudorf Military Training Area run by the Bundesheer is nationally important.

Transport 
Rail: Bruck an der Leitha railway station is an important transport hub on the Austrian Eastern Railway and of great importance for Bruckneudorf.

References

Bruck an der Leitha
Cities and towns in Neusiedl am See District
Divided cities
Twin cities